This is the list of presidents of Apulia since 1970.
Presidents elected by the Regional Council (1970–1995)

Directly-elected presidents (since 1995)

References

 
Politics of Apulia
Apulia